Paul Stuart Davies (born 24 June 1982) is a British soul singer, songwriter and vocal coach, best known for his work on the Northern soul and Motown scene.

Early career
Davies began performing on the North West pub and club circuit from the moment he left school in 1998. He studied music through Access to Music and Blackburn College before being asked to work for both, launching a career as a vocal coach. In 2003, Davies, along with guitarist Mark Bateson, set up Darwen School of Music (originally Elite School of Music) and in the same year received an award of excellence presented by Beatles producer Sir George Martin.

2012–present
Davies' first independent single release "Mighty by Nature" reached number 1 on the UK iTunes Rock chart in July 2012 and hit the number 28 spot in the official UK Indie Chart;
 despite having no official label backing. "Mighty by Nature" was written in memory of Lewis Mighty, a seven-year old victim of neuroblastoma.

Further recordings of "Let's Get It On" and "Time Will Pass You By" gained the attention of Janis Gaye (wife of Motown singer Marvin Gaye) and Northern soul DJ Russ Winstanley, leading to an increased presence on the UK's Northern soul scene.

In September 2015, Davies made his first of five appearances at the World's Biggest Northern Soul Weekender at Butlins resort, Skegness, Lincolnshire, England, performing alongside classic Motown artists The Velvelettes, Brenda Holloway, The Contours, and a duet with Kim Weston on "It Takes Two".

He returned in 2016 to share the stage with Tommy Hunt, Dean Parrish, Pat Lewis, Chris Clark and Sidney Barnes, where the group recorded a version of Frank Wilson's "Do I Love You (Indeed I Do)" for charity, along with Johnny Boy and the Signatures, under the name Northern Soul Survivors.

In 2017, Davies made his first visit to Detroit to record at the United Sound Systems studio. The single "Tomorrow's Love" was recorded at this time, with background vocal contributions from Kim Weston, Tobi Lark, Pat Lewis and original Vandellas Annette Beard and Rosalind Ashford. The B-side was Davies' rendition of "Wherever I Lay My Hat (That's My Home)" which he had previously released as a single featuring the Original Vandellas in 2016.

2018 saw Davies join Manchester Camerata and Joe Duddell for "Out on the Floor"; a live orchestrated Northern soul and Motown project that debuted at Manchester's Bridgewater Hall to rave reviews.

At the final 'Northern Soul Survivors' weekender in 2019, Paul worked with Gloria Jones, known for her original version of the song Tainted Love. Paul's friendship with Gloria led to the twinning of Darwen School of Music with the Marc Bolan School of Music, which she founded in West Africa. In January 2020, Paul travelled to Makeni in Sierra Leone to visit the school and to work with the orphans who attend.

"Wonderin" and "A Good Good Thing" were the first two singles to be released from Paul's long awaited album Lost Soul, with "A Good Good Thing" making the top 10 of the iTunes UK Soul Chart in August 2021.

2022 saw Paul team up with Motown number 1 recording artist “Charlene” to write and release ‘Fairytale Life’. Coincidentally, Charlene’s number 1 record I've Never Been to Me had been the number 1 record in the U.K. charts on the day Paul was born in 1982.

Discography

References

External links
 Single Hits Top 30
 Soul legend's wife loves singer Paul
 Soul man hoping for a breakthrough
 It Takes Two – Paul and Kim!
 Northern Soul Survivors Charity Single

English soul musicians
English male singers
English soul singers
1982 births
Living people
Musicians from Manchester